Philip Richard Sansom (19 September 1916 – 24 October 1999) was a British anarchist writer and activist.

Sansom began working life as a commercial artist. During the Second World War he was a conscientious objector, and worked in farming for a while. From 1943 he worked on War Commentary, a wartime substitute for the anarchist paper Freedom. With his co-editors Vernon Richards and John Hewetson, he was tried at the Old Bailey in 1945 and imprisoned for nine months for conspiring to publish an article allegedly inciting soldiers to disaffect from their duty or allegiance. He was a charismatic orator at Speakers' Corner, Hyde Park, and elsewhere in the 1950s and 1960s.

See also 
Freedom Defence Committee

References 

Anarchist writers
British conscientious objectors
1916 births
1999 deaths
English anarchists